Ivo Knoflíček (born 23 February 1962) is a Czech football coach and a former player. He played for the Czechoslovakia national team, for which he played 38 matches and scored seven goals. At club level, he played mostly for Slavia Prague. Knoflíček played a total of 50 matches in the Gambrinus liga, scoring seven goals.

He was a participant at the 1990 FIFA World Cup.

References

External links 
 

1962 births
Living people
People from Kyjov
Czech footballers
Czechoslovak footballers
Association football forwards
Czechoslovakia international footballers
Czech First League players
SK Slavia Prague players
FK Hvězda Cheb players
1. FK Příbram players
VfL Bochum players
FC St. Pauli players
SK Vorwärts Steyr players
Bundesliga players
2. Bundesliga players
1990 FIFA World Cup players
Czech football managers
SK Slavia Prague non-playing staff
Association football coaches
Czechoslovak expatriate footballers
Czechoslovak expatriate sportspeople in West Germany
Expatriate footballers in Germany
Czech expatriate sportspeople in Austria
Expatriate footballers in Austria
Sportspeople from the South Moravian Region
Expatriate footballers in West Germany
Czech expatriate footballers